Enrique Amorim (July 25, 1900 – July 28, 1960) was an Uruguayan novelist and writer, best known for his story Las quitanderas  whose plot centers on rural prostitution; also known for his left-wing politics.

Biography
Enrique Amorim was born in Salto, Uruguay to parents who were wealthy cattle ranchers. His father was from a Portuguese background, his mother Basque. Amorim travelled extensively in Europe and Latin America, developing acquaintanceships and friendships with many of the leading literary figures of his time. He eventually had a house built in Salto, designed by Le Corbusier.

In the 1920s Amorim wrote for the Argentine leftist magazine Los Pensadores and published with the press Claridad, both associated with the left-leaning Buenos Aires-based Boedo group.
In 1947 Amorim officially joined the Communist Party of Uruguay. He was also responsible for the erection of a monument in Salto to commemorate Federico García Lorca, the poet and playwright killed by Francisco Franco's forces in the opening weeks of the Spanish Civil War.

He is mentioned in Borges' story "Tlön, Uqbar, Orbis Tertius".

Works

Novels 
 La carreta (1929)
 El paisano Aguilar (1934)
 La edad despareja (1938)
 El caballo y su sombra (1941) (English translation The Horse and His Shadow (Scribner 1943))
 La luna se hizo con agua (1944)
 El asesino desvelado (1946)
 Feria de farsantes (1952)
 Eva Burgos (1960)

Books of short stories 
 Amorim (1923)
 Horizontes y bocacalles (1926)
 Tráfico (1927)
 La trampa del pajonal (1928)
 Del 1 al 6 (1932)
 La plaza de las carretas (1937)
 Después del temporal (1953)

Books of poems 
 Veinte años (1920)
 Visitas al cielo (1929)
 Poemas uruguayos (1935)
 Dos poemas (1940)
 Primero de Mayo (1949)
 Quiero (1954)
 Sonetos de amor en verano (1958)

Plays 
 La segunda sangre (1950)
 Don Juan 38 (1958)

References 
 K.E.A. Mose Enrique Amorim: The Passion of a Uruguayan (Madrid :Plaza Mayor, 1973)
 Alvaro Miranda Enrique Amorim // Enfoques críticos sobre Enrique Amorim (Montevideo: Editores Asociados, 1990)
 Leonardo Garet La pasión creadora de Enrique Amorim (Montevideo: Editores Asociados, 1990)

External links 

 Much of the information in this article comes from http://www.todo-argentina.net/Literatura_argentina/Biografias_de_literatura/enrique_amorim.htm.
 Biographical notes on Amorim and other famous natives of Salto
 IMDB filmography
 F. Scott Helwig "Narrative Techniques in the Novels of Enrique Amorim" (dissertation)

1900 births
1960 deaths
People from Salto, Uruguay
Uruguayan Marxist writers
Uruguayan people of Portuguese descent
Uruguayan communists
Uruguayan dramatists and playwrights
Male dramatists and playwrights
Uruguayan novelists
Male novelists
Uruguayan male short story writers
Uruguayan short story writers
20th-century novelists
20th-century dramatists and playwrights
20th-century short story writers